Kurgeh (also Romanized as Kūrgeh; also known as Kūrehgah) is a village in Kani Bazar Rural District, Khalifan District, Mahabad County, West Azerbaijan Province, Iran. At the 2006 census, its population was 54, in 9 families.

References 

Populated places in Mahabad County